Alexandre Sheldon-Duplaix (born 1963) is a French naval historian.

Early life
The son of an American father and a French mother, Alexandre Sheldon Duplaix  has dual American and French citizenships. He graduated from the Paris Institute of Political Science (Diplômé de l'Institut d'études politiques de Paris) and holds an MA in history and two pre-doctoral dissertations in history and political science from the Sorbonne.

Academic career 
For twelve years until 1999, he worked as a naval analyst under contract with the French Navy before joining the naval section of French Defence Historical Service (Service historique de la Défense, Département Marine), located in the Château de Vincennes, near Paris.  Since 2001, he has lectured on naval history at the French Joint Defense Staff College (Collège Interarmées de Défense) in Paris and at the Combat Systems and Naval Weapons School near Toulon (École des systèmes de combat et armes navales).

Published works

References

External links
https://web.archive.org/web/20110922110546/http://www.dsi-presse.com/?p=2775

1963 births
French naval historians
Living people
French male non-fiction writers